During the 1993–94 English football season, Norwich City F.C. competed in the Premier League.

Season summary 
Norwich City's achievements in 1992–93 were outstanding - a club-best third-place finish and their first ever European place, all of this achieved with a relatively tight transfer budget and one of the Premiership's smaller fan bases.

Manager Mike Walker's achievements were far from over as the campaign began. They were close behind runaway leaders Manchester United in the title race, but most impressively eliminated Bayern Munich from the UEFA Cup in the second round; in doing so, they became the only English side to beat Bayern on their own soil. The dream came to an end in the third round as the Canaries were eliminated by Inter Milan.

Walker quit the club in January to take over at Everton, and his assistant John Deehan took over. At this point Norwich were 7th and had at least one game in hand on most of their fellow contenders for European qualification. However, Deehan was unable to keep up the momentum and Norwich slumped to 12th place in the final table, the decline accelerated by a 10-match winless run which was the longest of any Premier League club during the season with the exception of Swindon's 16-match winless start. The record-breaking sale of young striker Chris Sutton to Blackburn Rovers left Norwich with a big hole to fill in their attack, and the only major signing of the close season was midfielder Mike Milligan from Oldham Athletic.

Final league table

Results
Norwich City's score comes first

Legend

FA Premier League

FA Cup

League Cup

UEFA Cup

Players

First-team squad
Squad at end of season

Left club during season

Notes

References

Norwich City F.C. seasons
Norwich City F.C.